Goniochaeta plagioides is a species of parasitic fly in the family Tachinidae.

Distribution
United States.

References

Diptera of North America
Taxa named by Charles Henry Tyler Townsend
Dexiinae
Insects described in 1891